Pamela Johnson (born 25 September 1948) is a British former swimmer. She competed in the women's 400 metre individual medley at the 1964 Summer Olympics.

References

External links
 

1948 births
Living people
British female swimmers
Olympic swimmers of Great Britain
Swimmers at the 1964 Summer Olympics
Place of birth missing (living people)
Female medley swimmers